Saligrah Khushiali or Salgirah Khushiali is a celebration of the birthday of present (Hazar) Imam, Aga Khan IV, on December 13 held by Nizari Ismaili Shiʿi Muslims.

Borrowed from Persian into Urdu and Hindi, the word means 'anniversary'.

References 

Islamic festivals
December observances
Islamic terminology